Luna Park is an amusement park complex in the Tel Aviv Fairgrounds in Tel Aviv, Israel.

History
Luna Park was established in 1970.  Luna Park attractions include Ferris wheels, bumper cars, carousels and roller coasters. In its early days, entrance was free and visitors paid only for rides.

There is also an Israeli children's song called  written in the 1950s, named for a previous iteration of Luna Park a few kilometers to the south in Jaffa.

Attractions

Roller coasters

Flat rides

Former attractions

References

External links
  Luna Park, Tel Aviv website

Amusement parks in Israel
Buildings and structures in Tel Aviv
Tourist attractions in Tel Aviv
1970 establishments in Israel